Spain competed at the 1998 Winter Olympics in Nagano, Japan.

Alpine skiing

Women

Cross-country skiing

Men

1 Starting delay based on 10 km results. 
C = Classical style, F = Freestyle

Men's 4 × 10 km relay

Figure skating

Women

Snowboarding

Men's halfpipe

References
Official Olympic Reports
 Olympic Winter Games 1998, full results by sports-reference.com

Nations at the 1998 Winter Olympics
1998
Olympics